is a passenger railway station located in the city of Higashikagawa, Kagawa Prefecture, Japan. It is operated by JR Shikoku and has the station number "T10".

Lines
Hiketa Station is served by the JR Shikoku Kōtoku Line and is located 45.1 km from the beginning of the line at Takamatsu.

Layout
The station consists of a side platform and an island platform serving three tracks. A station building houses a waiting room and a cafe. A JR ticket window (without a Midori no Madoguchi facility) is available but open for limited hours only. Access to the island platform is by means of a footbridge. A siding runs on the far side of the island platform beyond track 3. Another siding branches off track 1 and ends at a disused freight platform. 
Parking is available on the station forecourt.

History
At that time the station was operated by Japanese Government Railways, later becoming Japanese National Railways (JNR). With the privatization of JNR on 1 April 1987, control of the station passed to JR Shikoku.

Surrounding area
Hiketa Historical Preservation Area
Higashikagawa City Hiketa Office
Higashikagawa Municipal Hiketa Elementary School

See also
List of railway stations in Japan

References

External links

Official home page

Railway stations in Kagawa Prefecture
Railway stations in Japan opened in 1928
Higashikagawa, Kagawa